Fishing is the activity of trying to catch wild fish.

Fishing may also refer to:

 Fishing (Carracci), a 1590s painting
 Fishing (sculpture), a 1938 sculpture in the United States
 "Fishing" (song), a 1991 indie rock song

See also
 Phishing, the deceptive online practice.